Frank Connell (October 19, 1909 – July 25, 2002) was an American cyclist. He competed in the individual and team road race events at the 1932 Summer Olympics.

References

External links
 

1909 births
2002 deaths
American male cyclists
Olympic cyclists of the United States
Cyclists at the 1932 Summer Olympics
Sportspeople from Hoboken, New Jersey